Patrick "Pat" Garofalo (born September 23, 1971) is an American politician and member of the Minnesota House of Representatives. A member of the Republican Party of Minnesota, he represents District 58B, which includes portions of Dakota and Goodhue counties in the southeastern Twin Cities metropolitan area.

Education
Born in 1971 in Saint Paul, Minnesota, Garofalo graduated from Rosemount High School in Rosemount in 1989, then went on to Minnesota State University, Mankato in Mankato, earning his B.S. in law enforcement in 1994.

Minnesota House of Representatives
Garofalo was first elected in 2004 and has been reelected every two years since. In February 2008, he was named assistant minority whip for the Republican caucus. Garofalo served one term as chair of the Education Finance Committee in 2011–12, and chaired the Job Growth & Energy Affordability Committee from 2015 to 2018. He is now the minority lead of the Ways and Means Committee.

In March 2015, Garofalo posted on Twitter that if a majority of National Basketball Association teams were to fold, "nobody would notice a difference [with the] possible exception of increase in streetcrime." He said he was making an observation about crime among professional athletes, not a racist comment. He later apologized.

In 2015, after U.S. Representative John Kline announced he was not running for reelection, attention turned to Garofalo as a possible contender for the seat. After a recruiting visit to Washington, D.C. with House leadership, Garofalo told local media, "I would rather stick a fork in my eye than run for Congress".

In 2021, Garofalo called the U.S. Capitol attack by Donald Trump supporters "ridiculous" and "banana republic shit".

Personal life 
Garofalo and his family live in Farmington. He is a network engineer who works on computer infrastructure and IP telephony systems. He was the technology coordinator for Tim Pawlenty's 2002 gubernatorial campaign.

Electoral history

References

External links

 Rep. Pat Garofalo – official Minnesota House of Representatives website
 Minnesota Public Radio Votetracker: Rep. Pat Garofalo
 Project Votesmart – Rep. Pat Garofalo Profile
 Rep. Pat Garofalo official campaign website

1971 births
Living people
Minnesota State University, Mankato alumni
People from Farmington, Minnesota
Republican Party members of the Minnesota House of Representatives
21st-century American politicians
Politicians from Saint Paul, Minnesota